Coleoxestia is a genus of beetles in the family Cerambycidae, containing the following species:
 Coleoxestia anthracina Martins & Monne, 2005
 Coleoxestia apeara Galileo & Santos-Silva 2016
 Coleoxestia armata (Gounelle, 1909)
 Coleoxestia atrata (Gounelle, 1909)
 Coleoxestia aurigena Martins & Monne, 2005
 Coleoxestia beckeri Galileo, Martins & Santos-Silva 2015
 Coleoxestia brevipennis (Bates, 1870)
 Coleoxestia bettellaorum Galileo & Santos-Silva 2016
 Coleoxestia chemsaki Santos-Silva & Wappes 2017
 Coleoxestia cinnamomea (Gounelle, 1909)
 Coleoxestia clarkei Santos-Silva & Wappes 2017
 Coleoxestia corvina (Germar, 1824)
 Coleoxestia curoei Eya & Chemsak, 2005
 Coleoxestia denticornis (Gahan, 1892)
 Coleoxestia diamantina Nascimento & Santos-Silva 2018
 Coleoxestia ebenina Melzer, 1935
 Coleoxestia errata Martins & Monne, 2005
 Coleoxestia exotica Martins & Monne, 2005
 Coleoxestia eyai Santos-Silva & Wappes 2017
 Coleoxestia fasciola Martins & Monne, 2005
 Coleoxestia femorata (Gounelle, 1909)
 Coleoxestia fragosoi Santos-Silva & Wappes 2017
 Coleoxestia glabripennis (Bates, 1870)
 Coleoxestia globulicollis (Gahan, 1892)
 Coleoxestia guttula Martins & Monne, 2005
 Coleoxestia hovorei Santos-Silva & Wappes 2017
 Coleoxestia illex (Gounelle, 1909)
 Coleoxestia julietae Galileo & Martins, 2006
 Coleoxestia kuratai Eya & Chemsak, 2005
 Coleoxestia lissonota Fragoso, 1993
 Coleoxestia moromokoi Galileo & Santos-Silva 2016
 Coleoxestia nigripes Martins & Monne, 2005
 Coleoxestia nigropicea (Bates, 1870)
 Coleoxestia nitida (Bates, 1872)
 Coleoxestia nitidissima Eya & Chemsak, 2005
 Coleoxestia olivieri Fragoso, 1993
 Coleoxestia pirrensis Eya & Chemsak, 2005
 Coleoxestia polita (Waterhouse, 1880)
 Coleoxestia pubicornis (Gounelle, 1909)
 Coleoxestia rachelae Eya & Chemsak, 2005
 Coleoxestia rafaeli Santos-Silva & Wappes 2017
 Coleoxestia rubromaculata (Gounelle, 1909)
 Coleoxestia rufosemivittata Tippmann, 1960
 Coleoxestia sanguinipes (Bates, 1884)
 Coleoxestia semipubescens Melzer, 1923
 Coleoxestia setigera Melzer, 1926
 Coleoxestia sobrina Melzer, 1923
 Coleoxestia spinifemorata Fragoso, 1993
 Coleoxestia spinipennis (Audinet-Serville, 1834)
 Coleoxestia spinosa Galileo & Martins, 2010
 Coleoxestia striatepunctata Eya & Chemsak, 2005
 Coleoxestia thomasi Eya & Chemsak, 2005
 Coleoxestia tupunhuna Martins & Monne, 2005
 Coleoxestia vittata (Thomson, 1860)
 Coleoxestia waterhousei (Gounelle, 1909)
 Coleoxestia weemsi Galileo & Santos-Silva 2016

References

 
Cerambycidae genera